James Black Ronald (27 August 1861 – 27 July 1941) was an Australian politician.

Life 
Born in Scotland, he was educated at the University of Edinburgh, and became a Presbyterian clergyman. Migrating to Australia in 1888, he became a clergyman in Melbourne. In 1901, he attempted to gain Protectionist endorsement to contest the Australian House of Representatives seat of Southern Melbourne; when he was unsuccessful, he turned to the Labor Party, which endorsed him instead. Ronald won the seat, one of only two Victorian Labor members elected in the first federal election. Ronald's seat was abolished in 1906, and he attempted to gain Labor endorsement to contest the neighbouring Melbourne Ports. When this endorsement was given to James Mathews instead, Ronald contested the seat as an independent Labor candidate, but was unsuccessful. He rejoined the ALP after the election, but was one of many Labor members to leave in 1916 over the issue of conscription, eventually ending up in the Nationalist Party. Ronald died in 1941.

References

Australian Labor Party members of the Parliament of Australia
Members of the Australian House of Representatives for Southern Melbourne
Members of the Australian House of Representatives
1861 births
1941 deaths
Independent members of the Parliament of Australia
20th-century Australian politicians